Liparis may refer to:
 Liparis (amphipod), an invalid synonym of the skeleton shrimp genus Caprella
 Liparis (fish), a genus of snailfishes
 Liparis (plant), a genus of orchids
 Liparis was the ancient name of the Mezitli River